Erythranthe suksdorfii, with the common names Suksdorf's monkeyflower and miniature monkeyflower, is an annual flowering plant in the family Phrymaceae (Lopseed). It was formerly known as Mimulus suksdorfii. A specimen collected in Washington state in 1885 by the self-taught immigrant botanist Wilhelm Nikolaus Suksdorf was identified as a new species by Asa Gray in 1886, who named it in Suksdorf's honor. It can easily be misidentified with Erythranthe breviflora, which generally has elliptic leaves rather than the linear or oblong leaves found in E.  suksdorfii.

Distribution and habitat
E. suksdorfii is native to Washington, Oregon, California, Idaho, Montana, Wyoming, Colorado, Nevada, Utah, Arizona, and New Mexico. It grows well in wetland-riparian areas that are moist in springtime and forests with Yellow Pine, Red Fir, and/or Lodgepole Pine in subalpine regions. Soils with good drainage are preferred. Its range has been severely impacted by human activity, resulting in having the status of "sensitive" from the Bureau of Land Management and United States Forest Service.

Description
E. suksdorfii is a dicot herb. It flowers from mid-April to July, depending upon locality. The calyx is mildly hairy. The leaves are opposite, slender, tapered, and hairy and generally sessile.

References

External links
 
 

suksdorfii
Flora of the West Coast of the United States
Flora of Arizona
Flora of California
Flora of Colorado
Flora of Idaho
Flora of Montana
Flora of Nevada
Flora of New Mexico
Flora of Oregon
Flora of Utah
Flora of Washington (state)
Flora of Wyoming
Flora of the Sierra Nevada (United States)
Natural history of the California chaparral and woodlands
Flora without expected TNC conservation status